You've Come a Long Way, Baby is the second studio album by Fatboy Slim, a project of English electronic music producer Norman Cook. It was first released on 19 October 1998 in the United Kingdom by Skint Records and a day later in the United States by Astralwerks. Cook recorded and produced the album at his home studio in Brighton, known as the House of Love, using an Atari ST computer, Creator software, and floppy disks. The photo on the album cover was originally taken at the 1983 Fat Peoples Festival in Danville, Virginia; for the North American release, the album cover was changed to an image of shelves stacked with records.

You've Come a Long Way, Baby proved to be Cook's global breakthrough album, peaking at number one on the UK Albums Chart and number 34 on the US Billboard 200. Praised by critics for its sound and style, the album brought international attention to Cook, earning him a Brit Award in 1999, and was later certified four times platinum by the BPI and platinum by the RIAA. Four singles were released from the album: "The Rockafeller Skank", "Gangster Tripping", "Praise You", and "Right Here, Right Now", all of which peaked within the top ten on the UK Singles Chart. "Build It Up – Tear It Down" was also released as a promotional single.

Title and artwork
The title You've Come a Long Way, Baby was derived from a marketing slogan for Virginia Slims cigarettes. The previously released "The Rockafeller Skank" single liner notes revealed that a once tentative title for the album had been Let's Hear It for the Little Guy.

Conceived by Red Design, the album's primary cover art features an obese young man dressed in a T-shirt bearing the words "I'm #1 so why try harder" while holding a cigarette in his left hand. The original photograph was taken at the 1983 Fat People's Festival in Danville, Virginia and provided by the Rex Features photo library. Despite a series of inquiries, the man has not been identified.

Additional photography for the You've Come a Long Way, Baby liner notes was provided by Simon Thornton. The cover image was changed in North America to an image of shelves stacked with records.

Critical reception

You've Come a Long Way, Baby received critical acclaim. According to Stephen Thomas Erlewine of AllMusic, it "came damn close to being the definitive big beat album... a seamless record, filled with great imagination, unexpected twists and turns, huge hooks, and great beats." In 2000, the album was ranked number 81 in Q magazine's readers' poll of the "100 Greatest British Albums Ever". The album was also included in the book 1001 Albums You Must Hear Before You Die.

In 1999, it was certified 3× platinum by the British Phonographic Industry (BPI), 3×Platinum by the Australian Record Industry Association and platinum by the Recording Industry Association of America (RIAA).

Track listing 

Sample credits
 "Right Here, Right Now" contains samples of "Ashes, the Rain, and I", written by Dale Peters and Joe Walsh, and performed by the James Gang.
 "The Rockafeller Skank" contains samples of "Sliced Tomatoes", written by Winifred Terry and performed by the Just Brothers, and "Beat Girl", written and performed by John Barry.
 "Gangster Trippin" contains samples of "Entropy", written and performed by DJ Shadow (Josh Davis), and "Beatbox Wash", written and performed by the Dust Junkys (Sam Brox, Ganiyu Pierre Gasper, Stephen Jones, Nicholas Lockett and Myke Wilson).
 "Build It Up – Tear It Down" contains samples of "The Acid Test", written by Patricia Miller and performed by The Purple Fox.
 "Soul Surfing" contains samples of "I'll Do a Little Bit More", written by Earl Nelson and Fred Smith, and performed by The Olympics.
 "Praise You" contains samples of "Take Yo Praise", written and performed by Camille Yarbrough.

Personnel
Credits for You've Come a Long Way, Baby adapted from liner notes.
 Norman Cook – performer, production
 Red Design – photography
 Simon Thornton – engineering, mixing, photography
 Eve – provides the vocals for the song "Cowboy".
 Freddy Fresh – provides the vocal sample for the song "Fucking in Heaven".
 Myriam Tisler – provides the vocals for the song "Radioactivity".

Charts

Weekly charts

Year-end charts

Certifications

Release history

References

External links
 
 
 You've Come A Long Way Baby at Spotify

1998 albums
Fatboy Slim albums
Skint Records albums